Elizabeth of Brunswick-Grubenhagen (20 March 1550 – 11 February 1586) was the first wife of Duke   John of Schleswig-Holstein-Sonderburg, the son of King Christian III of Denmark.

Family 
Elisabeth was born on
20 March 1550. She was the only daughter of Duke Ernest III of Brunswick-Grubenhagen and his wife, Duchess Margaret of Pomerania.

Marriage 
Elisabeth married the Duke John of Schleswig-Holstein-Sonderburg on 19 Aug 1568.

 Dorothy of Schleswig-Holstein-Sonderburg (1569–1593), in 1589, she married the Duke Frederick IV of Liegnitz (died 1596)
 Christian of Schleswig-Holstein-Sonderburg (1570–1633), Duke of Schleswig-Holstein-Arroë
 Ernest of Schleswig-Holstein-Sonderburg (1572–1596)
 Alexander of Schleswig-Holstein-Sonderburg, Duke of Schleswig-Holstein-Sonderburg
 Augustus of Schleswig-Holstein-Sonderburg (1574–1596)
 Mary of Schleswig-Holstein-Sonderburg (1575–1640), she became Abbess of Itzehoe
 John-Adolphus of Schleswig-Holstein-Sonderburg-Norburg (1576–1624), Duke of Schleswig-Holstein-Norburg
 Anne of Schleswig-Holstein-Sonderburg (1577–1616), in 1601, married Duke Bogusław XIII of Pomerania-Barth (died 1606)
 Sophie of Schleswig-Holstein-Sonderburg (1579–1618), in 1607, married Duke Philip II of Pomerania-Barth (died 1618)
 Elizabeth of Schleswig-Holstein-Sonderburg (1580–1653), in 1625, married Duke Bogusław XIV of Pomerania (died 1637)
 Frederick of Schleswig-Holstein-Norburg (1581–1658), Duke of Schleswig-Holstein-Sonderburg-Norburg, in 1627, married Juliana of Saxe-Lauenbourg (daughter of Duke Francis II of Saxe-Lauenbourg), (one child). Veuf, married in 1632 Eleonor of Anhalt-Zerbst (died 1681), (daughter of Prince Rudolph of Anhalt-Zerbst) (five children)
 Margaret of Schleswig-Holstein-Sonderburg (1583–1658), in 1603, married Count John VII of Nassau-Siegen (died 1623)
 Philip of Schleswig-Holstein-Sonderburg-Glücksburg, Duke of Schleswig-Holstein-Sonderburg-Glücksbourg, he founded the second branch
 Albert of Schleswig-Holstein-Sonderburg (1585–1613).

House of Oldenburg in Schleswig-Holstein
1550 births
1586 deaths
Daughters of monarchs